The 2001 U.S. Men's Clay Court Championships was a men's tennis tournament played on outdoor clay courts at the Westside Tennis Club in Houston, Texas in the United States and was part of the International Series of the 2001 ATP Tour. It was the 33rd edition of the tournament and ran from April 30 through May 6, 2001. Unseeded Andy Roddick, who entered the main draw on a wildcard, won the singles title.

Finals

Singles

 Andy Roddick defeated  Hyung-Taik Lee 7–5, 6–3
 It was Roddick's 2nd singles title of the year and of his career.

Doubles

 Mahesh Bhupathi /  Leander Paes defeated  Kevin Kim /  Jim Thomas 7–6(7–4), 6–2
 It was Bhupathi's 2nd title of the year and the 19th of his career. It was Paes's 2nd title of the year and the 22nd of his career.

References

External links
 Official website
 ATP tournament profile

 
U.S. Men's Clay Court Championships
U.S. Men's Clay Court Championships
U.S. Men's Clay Court Championships
U.S. Men's Clay Court Championships
U.S. Men's Clay Court Championships
U.S. Men's Clay Court Championships